Synnympha perfrenis is a moth of the family Gracillariidae. It is known from the Bengal region of what is now India and Bangladesh.

The larvae feed on Heritiera littoralis. They probably mine the leaves of their host plant.

References

Gracillariinae
Moths of Asia
Moths described in 1920